Azrieli Center (Merkaz Azrieli) is a complex of skyscrapers in Tel Aviv. At the base of the center lies a large shopping mall. The center was originally designed by Israeli-American architect Eli Attia, and after he fell out with the developer of the center David Azrieli (after whom it is named), completion of the design was passed on to the Tel Aviv firm of Moore Yaski Sivan Architects.

Site
The Azrieli Center is located on a  site in Tel Aviv, Israel, which was previously used as Tel Aviv's dumpster-truck parking garage. The project cost US$420,000,000.

Circular Tower
Construction of this tower began in 1996 and was completed in 1999. The tower has 49 floors, making it at the time of its construction the tallest building in Tel Aviv and the second tallest in Israel, after the Moshe Aviv Tower in Ramat Gan, which was built in 2001. The top floor has an indoor observation deck and a high-end restaurant, and the 48th floor is home to Mr. Azrieli's personal office. 

Each floor of the Circular Tower has 84 windows, giving the tower more than 4,000 windows.

On October 31, 2003, the first annual Azrieli Circular Tower run-up competition was held, in which the participants ran up the 1,144 stairs to the tower's roof. Winners of the contest had the chance to participate in the following year's Empire State Building run-up competition in New York City.

Triangular Tower
Construction of this tower, like the circular tower, began in 1996 and was completed in 1999. It has 46 floors and its main occupant is Bezeq, Israel's largest telecommunications company; Bezeq occupies 13 floors of the tower. The tower's cross-section is an equilateral triangle.

Square Tower
The Azrieli Center Square Tower was completed in June 2007. The tower has 42 floors, and is 154m high. It is the shortest of the three towers in the Azrieli complex. Construction of the third tower was stopped in 1998 due to urban planning disagreements and was resumed in 2006.

The lower 13 floors house Africa Israel's Crowne Plaza business hotel. The upper floors are used as office space.

Shopping center
The Azrieli Center Mall is one of the largest in Israel. There are about 30 restaurants, fast-food counters, cafes and food stands in the mall. The top floor of the mall is a popular hangout spot for teens, and many online message boards arrange get-togethers there during national holidays.

Due to high, constant terrorism threats, the Azrieli towers are guarded to deter terrorist action, like many buildings in Israel.

Other features
The large complex boasted an 8-screen cinema until 2010, when H&M took over the space. Azrieli also features a large fitness club, night schools, a small kid-focused amusement park and a pedestrian bridge leading to Tel Aviv HaShalom Railway Station. A second pedestrian bridge, completed in March 2003, connects the Azrieli Center with the other side of Begin Road and HaKirya. It is expected that a connection between Kaplan underpass and the project's underground carpark, which is one of the largest ever built in the region, will be constructed. When completed, the  plot which the Center occupies will offer a 400-seat, open air auditorium.

Access
The Azrieli Center is bordered by the Ayalon Highway that crosses Tel Aviv from North to South, Begin Road and Giv'at HaTahmoshet Street (a short section that connects Kaplan Street with HaShalom Road). It is situated next to the HaShalom Interchange on the Ayalon Highway.

The center can be easily accessed from most parts of Israel by train to the Tel Aviv HaShalom Railway Station which is connected to the center by an enclosed pedestrian bridge or by one of the many buses that stop on Begin Road. In addition, the Tel Aviv Arlozorov Bus Terminal is located 1 kilometer north of the complex.

Future Azrieli Tower 
The Azrieli Tower is a planned 350 meter high spiral skyscraper which will be incorporated into the Azrieli Center complex. The Azrieli Tower will be the tallest in Israel when completed surpassing the current tallest skyscraper; Azrieli Sarona Tower.

Gallery

See also
List of skyscrapers in Israel
List of shopping malls in Israel
YOO Towers

References

External links

 Catch up for Tower 3 - World Architecture News

Office buildings completed in 1999
Skyscrapers in Tel Aviv
Postmodern architecture
Shopping malls in Israel
Tourist attractions in Tel Aviv
Skyscraper hotels
Skyscraper office buildings in Israel
Skyscrapers in Israel
Residential skyscrapers in Israel
1999 establishments in Israel